Pertsov (feminine: Pertsova) is a Russian-language surname. Notable people with the surname include:

Pyotr Pertsov, Russian poet, publisher, editor, literary critic, journalist and memoirist
Stanislav Pertsov, Ukrainian competitive figure skater

See also

Pertsev

Russian-language surnames